Singing His Praise is a studio album by American country artists Bill Anderson and Jan Howard. It was released in March 1972 on Decca Records and was produced by Owen Bradley. It was the pair's first album collection of gospel songs and it would also be the duo's final album together.

Background and content
Singing His Praise was recorded in February 1972 at Bradley's Barn, a studio owned by the album's producer, Owen Bradley. Anderson and Howard had been collaborating with Bradley since their first studio release together in 1967. Bradley also contributed to both of the artists individual career. The album consisted of 11 tracks and was the duo's first album collection of gospel music. Anderson and Howard selected gospel music they enjoyed performing together while on tour as well as material they had not yet performed. Many of these songs were hymns such as "Swing Low, Sweet Chariot", "Precious Memories" and "The Lord's Prayer".

Singing His Praise was released in March 1972 via Decca Records in a vinyl record format. It included 6 songs on the first side and 5 songs on the second side.

Track listing

Personnel
All credits are adapted from the liner notes of Singing His Praise.

Musical and technical personnel
 Bill Anderson – lead vocals
 Harold Bradley – guitar
 Owen Bradley – producer
 Ray Edenton – guitar
 Buddy Harman – drums
 Jan Howard – lead vocals
 Roy Huskey – bass
 The Jordanaires – background vocals
 Grady Martin – guitar
 Hargus "Pig" Robbins – piano
 Hal Rugg – steel guitar
 Karen Shearer – liner notes
 Pete Wade – guitar

Release history

References

1972 albums
Bill Anderson (singer) albums
Jan Howard albums
Decca Records albums
Albums produced by Owen Bradley
Vocal duet albums